Campo Municipal da Nogueira is the home stadium of Associação Desportiva da Camacha (AD Camacha), a football team from the Portuguese island of Madeira. The stadium has a capacity of 3,300. The current stadium has one stand around the stadium which is on the west side of the stadium and has engraved on the spectators seats the name of the club in blue. The stadium was built when the club was founded in 1978.

Sports venues in Portugal
Sport in Madeira
Buildings and structures in Madeira
Sports venues completed in 1978
1978 establishments in Portugal